The 1997–98 NBA season was the Warriors' 52nd season in the National Basketball Association, and 36th in the San Francisco Bay Area. The Warriors received the eighth pick in the 1997 NBA draft, and selected Adonal Foyle out of Colgate University. The Warriors also moved into their new arena, known as The Arena in Oakland. During the off-season, the team acquired second-year center Erick Dampier from the Indiana Pacers, and Brian Shaw from the Orlando Magic. Early into the season, they traded B. J. Armstrong to the Charlotte Hornets in exchange for Muggsy Bogues and second-year guard Tony Delk. However, under new head coach P.J. Carlesimo, the Warriors struggled losing their first nine games, which led to an awful 1–14 start. Things would get even worse in December as All-Star guard Latrell Sprewell choked, and assaulted Carlesimo during practice, and was suspended for the remainder of the season, which was 68 games left in the Warriors' schedule. Sprewell averaged 21.4 points, 4.9 assists and 1.4 steals per game in only just 14 games.

Without their star guard, the Warriors showed slight improvement before suffering a 14-game losing streak between December and January, and held a miserable 8–37 record at the All-Star break. At midseason, the team traded Shaw along with Joe Smith to the Philadelphia 76ers in exchange for Jim Jackson and Clarence Weatherspoon, and acquired Jason Caffey from the Chicago Bulls. The Warriors won their final three games, and finished sixth in the Pacific Division with an awful 19–63 record.

Donyell Marshall showed improvement becoming the team's starting small forward, averaging 15.4 points, 8.6 rebounds and 1.3 steals per game, and finished in third place in Most Improved Player voting, while Dampier provided the team with 11.8 points, 8.7 rebounds and 1.7 blocks per game, and Delk contributed 10.4 points per game off the bench. In addition, Bimbo Coles provided with 8.0 points and 4.7 assists per game, but only played 53 games due to hamstring and foot injuries, and Bogues contributed 5.8 points and 5.5 assists per game. Following the season, Sprewell was traded to the New York Knicks after six seasons in Oakland, while Jackson signed as a free agent with the Portland Trail Blazers, and Weatherspoon signed with the Miami Heat.

For the season, the Warriors changed their primary logo, which showed a warrior holding a lightning bolt in front of a basketball, and got new uniforms adding dark navy and orange to their color scheme. The uniforms lasted until 2002, where they added side panels to their jerseys and shorts, while the logo remained in use until 2010.

Offseason

Draft picks

Roster

Roster Notes
 Shooting guard Latrell Sprewell was suspended for 68 games for choking, and assaulting head coach P.J. Carlesimo during practice on December 1.

Regular season

Season standings

z - clinched division title
y - clinched division title
x - clinched playoff spot

Record vs. opponents

Game log

Player statistics

Season

Awards and records

Transactions

Trades

Free agents

Player Transactions Citation:

References

See also
 1997-98 NBA season

Golden State Warriors seasons
Golden
Golden
Golden State